Frank Devine (17 December 1931 – 3 July 2009) was a New Zealand–born Australian newspaper editor and journalist. Devine was born in the South Island city of Blenheim and started his career there aged 17 as a cadet on the Marlborough Express. In 1953, Devine worked for West Australian Newspapers in Perth, contributing to the Western Mail. He later worked as a foreign correspondent in New York, London and Tokyo before returning to Perth as editor of the Weekend News in 1970.
In 1971, he was appointed editor-in-chief of Australian Reader's Digest. After ten years, he transferred to a senior editorial position at the Digest in New York.

Remaining in the United States, Devine was appointed editor at the Chicago Sun-Times by Rupert Murdoch. In 1986, he left Chicago to take on the role of editor at the New York Post.  In later life, Devine was a columnist and editor of The Australian. He contributed a monthly column for Quadrant from 2002 to 2009; he prepared a collection of these columns, Older and Wiser, just before he died.

He married Jacqueline Magee in April 1959, with whom he had three children. The eldest, Miranda Devine, has been a columnist for the Sydney Morning Herald and the Daily Telegraph.

References

External links
 David Banks, Beloved mentor and mate skips the Ashes , The Australian, 11 July 2009.
 Peter Coleman, 'My Friend Frank'
 Christopher Pearson, Frank conviviality of a Devine fellow soul , The Australian, 11 July 2009.

1931 births
2009 deaths
Australian columnists
New Zealand emigrants to Australia
People from Blenheim, New Zealand
Australian newspaper editors
The Australian journalists
Editors of New York City newspapers
Australian essayists
Australian male writers
Male essayists
Quadrant (magazine) people
Australian Roman Catholics
20th-century Roman Catholics
21st-century Roman Catholics
20th-century essayists
20th-century Australian journalists